The Sound Inside is a play written by Adam Rapp. The play premiered at the Williamstown Theatre Festival, running from June 27, 2018 to July 8. The production was directed by David Cromer and starred Mary-Louise Parker and Will Hochman. The play premiered on Broadway at Studio 54 with the same cast and creative team, premiering in previews on September 14, 2019 and officially on October 17. It closed on January 12, 2020. The play received six Tony Award nominations, including for Best Play; Parker won the Tony Award for Best Actress in a Play.

Awards and nominations

References

External links 

 Internet Broadway Database

2018 plays
Tony Award-winning plays